The Animal Protection Party of Canada is a minor registered political party in Canada that focuses on animal rights and environmentalism. It was formed in 2005 as the Animal Alliance Environment Voters Party of Canada by the merger of two organizations, the Animal Alliance of Canada and Environment Voters; it changed to its current name in 2016. Both parent organizations have been vocal in opposition to the seal hunt in Newfoundland and Labrador, fur farming, trapping, and bear hunting. The party is led by Liz White, a Toronto-based animal rights advocate.

Influence of electoral law
Federal laws restricting political advocacy by "third parties" (i.e., organizations not registered by Elections Canada as political parties) during election campaigns led to the formation of this party. Following a Supreme Court of Canada ruling that allowed political parties to be registered by only running a single candidate, animal rights activists formed the party. The AAEV party provides its members and candidates the opportunity to promote its views during election periods.

The party originally endorsed major-party candidates who promoted positions favourable to its own. In the 2006 general election, AAEV's free-time political ads endorsed the New Democratic Party, counterbalanced by the statement that voters could also vote for AAEV party leader Liz White in Toronto Centre.

Canadian electoral laws hinder misuse of this loophole by setting campaign spending limits for parties, proportional to the number of voters in the electoral districts where the party is running candidates. Because the AAEV was running only one candidate, it was permitted to spend $66,715.37, compared to the $18,225,260.74 limits granted to the major national parties. In 2008, the party ran four candidates. In 2011, it ran 7 candidates with one candidate in the Western Arctic riding. In 2015, the party ran 8 candidates, with one in Victoria, British Columbia.  In 2019, the party ran 15 candidates.  The party now acts like a traditional political party and rarely endorses other parties or candidates.

Candidates

2008 candidates
In the 2008 general election, the AAEVPC fielded four candidates, all in Ontario:
 Marie Crawford in Toronto–Danforth
 Karen Levenson in Guelph
 Simon Luisi in Davenport
 Liz White in Toronto Centre

2011 candidates

In the 2011 general election, the AAEVPC fielded seven candidates: six in Ontario, one in the territories:
 Marie Crawford in Toronto—Danforth
 Bonnie Dawson in Western Arctic
 Karen Levenson in Guelph
 Simon Luisi in Davenport
 Yvonne Mackie in Newmarket—Aurora
 AnnaMaria Valastro in London North Centre
 Liz White in Thornhill

2015 candidates
In the 2015 general election, the AAEVPC fielded eight candidates: seven in Ontario, one in British Columbia:
 Elizabeth Abbott in Toronto—Danforth
 Kyle Bowles in Aurora-Oak Ridges-Richmond Hill
 Jody Di Bartolomeo in Niagara Centre
 Emma Hawley-Yan in Waterloo
 Simon Luisi in University-Rosedale
 Jordan Reichert in Victoria
 Rudy Brunell Solomonivici in Eglinton-Lawrence
 Liz White in Etobicoke-Lakeshore

2019 candidates
In the 2019 general election, the APPC fielded fifteen candidates: eight in Ontario, two in British Columbia, two in New Brunswick, one in Quebec, one in Nova Scotia, and one in Alberta.
 Liz White in University-Rosedale
 Shelby Bertrand in Ottawa Centre
 Natalie Spizziri in Mississauga-Streetsville
 Simon Luisi in Scarborough Southwest
 Ellen Pappenburg in Kitchener Centre
 Rob Lewen in Toronto Centre
 Elizabeth Abbott in Toronto—Danforth
 Chanel Lalonde in Sudbury (electoral district)
 Victoria de Martigny in Lac-Saint-Louis
 Brad MacDonald in Moncton-Riverview-Dieppe
 Lesley Thomas in Fredericton
 Bill Wilson in Halifax
 Eden Gould in Calgary Centre
 Jordan Reichert in Victoria
 Kira Cheeseborough in Kamloops-Thompson-Cariboo

2021 candidates 
In the 2021 federal election, the APPC fielded ten candidates: six in Ontario, one in British Columbia, two in Quebec, and one in Manitoba.

 Kimberly LaMontange in Laurier Saint-Marie
 Lucas Munger in Drummond
 Shelby Bertrand in Ottawa Centre
 Liz White in Toronto-Danforth
 Peter Stubbins in Toronto Centre
 Natalie Spizziri in Mississauga-Streetsville
 Karen Levenson in Guelph
 Ellen Papenburg in Kitchener Centre
 Debra Wall in Winnipeg Centre
 Jordan Reichert in Victoria

Election results

See also
 List of animal advocacy parties
 List of political parties in Canada

References

External links

Animal Protection Party of Canada (I) – Canadian Political Parties and Political Interest Groups – Web Archive created by the University of Toronto Libraries
Animal Protection Party of Canada (II) – Canadian Political Parties and Political Interest Groups – Web Archive created by the University of Toronto Libraries

Federal political parties in Canada
Animal advocacy parties
Political parties established in 2005
2005 establishments in Ontario
Animal welfare organizations based in Canada
Environmentalism in Canada
Single-issue political parties in Canada